Soliman Pasha al-Faransawi (Süleyman Pasha the French; 17 May 1788 – 12 March 1860), born Joseph Anthelme Sève, was a French-born Egyptian commander.

Biography
Joseph Anthelme Sève was born in Lyon. He became a sailor. Later he joined the army of Napoleon Bonaparte. He fought at the battles of Trafalgar and Waterloo. After the war ended in 1815, he resigned from Napoleon's Army and worked as a merchant.

At this time, Muhammad Ali Pasha, also known as Muhammad Ali of Egypt, was recruiting European officers to train his newly formed military on modern warfare and soldierly discipline. Sève travelled to Egypt, changed his name and converted to Islam. He was placed in charge of the new soldiers' school at Aswan, now the Egyptian Military Academy. His task was to train a new model army of Sudanese slaves. When this did not work out, Muhammed Ali sent him other ethnicities to train as officers: Egypt-born Circassians, Albanians and Greeks.

Marriage and children
He married a Greek woman, ⁣ Maria Myriam Hanem, with whom he had four children. Asmaa el mahdi al Faransawi, Nazli al Faransawi, Muhammed bey el mahdi al Faransawi (Iskander bey) and Zuhra al Faransawi.One of his great-granddaughters was Queen Nazli, wife of King Fuad, and mother of King Farouk. Suleiman Pasha died in Cairo.

He still has many descendants living in Egypt.

Death

His tomb is in Old Cairo, and the body of his wife is buried nearby.

Legacy
There is a statue of him in the Egyptian National Military Museum inside the Cairo Citadel and a bust at the Préfecture in Lyon, France.

Seve's most famous quote was “I loved three men in my whole life, my father, Napoleon and Muhammad Ali”

References

External links 

 Biography

1788 births
1860 deaths
Converts to Islam
Egyptian people of the Egyptian–Ottoman War (1839–1841)
Egyptian soldiers
French Muslims
Egyptian Muslims
Military personnel from Lyon
Pashas
Egyptian pashas
Egyptian people of French descent
French military personnel of the Napoleonic Wars